Norbert Busè (born 1963) is a German documentary filmmaker, film producer, and director.

Biography 
Norbert Busè was raised in Erbach im Odenwald, Germany. Until 1993 he worked as an editor at the German public-service broadcaster ZDF and also appeared on air as the presenter of the consumer-advice programme KONTAKTE. Since 1991 he has been working on film projects and questions of media education. In 1993, he moved to Berlin and directed documentary films alongside his own experimental short films.

Work 
Focus points for his work so far have been cultural, with a particular emphasis on music. The first of his films shot for ZDF, Auf Teufel komm raus [Come Hell or High Water], considers the meaning of music in adolescent development, by example of the New Wave scene.

In 2003 Busè began, in co-operation with UNESCO, ZDF and 3sat, the production of the 12-piece film project Meisterwerke der Menschheit [Mankind's Masterpieces]. The films showed the humanity's intangible cultural heritage and the threat under which even music finds itself.

AVA - Die Stimme meiner Mutter [AVA- The Voice of my Mother], a 90-minute music documentary film, was Busè’s first feature-length film about the legacy and potential loss of Russian folk songs. He produced over 30 episodes of the Arte Lounge programme, which at first broadcast classical music from a Berlin club. In 2010 he organised a choral festival in South Africa for the European cultural broadcaster Arte, the culmination of which was a joint performance from all the choirs involved of the freedom song ‘Ukuthula’. Films he produced about musicians such as Karlheinz Stockhausen, John Cage, Elvis Presley, Sergiu Celibidache and Richard Strauss have also attracted international recognition. Additionally, he has been one of few in the industry to bring to television the traditional stage dance of Russia, Bolivia, India, Malaysia and Cuba, preserving their native environment and thereby awakening a deeper understanding of dance. In 2009 he took over as Head of Factual Programming at Studio TV Film in Berlin.

Recognition 
Norbert Busè has been officially recognised for his work , including internationally. In 1999 he won the audience-choice award in the youth category from the Film Council of Bremen [Filmbüro Bremen] with his first short film, Incubus. In 2004 he was awarded the Media Prize of the German Diabetes Foundation [Deutsche Diabetes-Stiftung] for his documentary on the epidemic of prosperity. In 2011, his production of Arte Lounge was nominated for the Grimme Prize in the entertainment category. In 2011 the four-part series Auf den Spuren von Easy Rider [Tracking Down Easy Rider] was awarded the gold medal for best production in the cultural category at the world's biggest television trade-show, NAB in Las Vegas. In 2014 he was nominated at the International Classical Music Awards for his directing of the film Sergiu Celibidache - Feuerkopf und Philosophy [Sergiu Celibidache: firebrand and philosopher]. In 2015 his production Richard Strauss and his Heroines won the ECHO Classical award for best DVD-production of the year, and at the International Classical Music Awards.
"The former ZDF editor and experienced filmmaker Norbert Busé knows all about the cultural history of the 20th century - which expressly includes popular culture as well as the fine arts. In his extensive film oeuvre he has already portrayed the "greats" such as Stockhausen, John Cage or George Tabori, as well as the stars of the masses: Elvis Presley, the Chinese State Circus or simply the Moving Republic of Germany." (Thomas Schneider, Haus des Dokumentarfilms)

Filmography 
1990: Vor was habt Ihr eigentlich Angst? [What are you really afraid of?]

1992: Auf Teufel komm raus [Come Hell or High Water]

1993: Dünne Haut [Thin Skinned]

1993: Asche im Wind [Ashes in the Wind]

1994: Ich habe die Hölle gesehen [I Have Seen Hell]

1995: Zwischen Knast und Kindergarten [Between Prison and Preschool]

1996: Der Zauberer [The Sorcerers]

1998: Schmerz muss sein [Pain Is Unavoidable]

1998: Das Lied der Stille [The Song of Silence]

1999: Shivas Töchter (Tanz-Dokumentation) [Shiva's Daughters: a dance documentary]

2000: Der Auftrag [The Assignment]

2000: Der Spieler [The Player]

2001: Der Choreograph Mats Ek [Mats Ek: Choreographer]

2002: Nullen + Einsen [Zeroes + Ones]

2002: Diamanten in Kinderhand [Diamonds in the Hand of a Child]

2003: Tänze aus der verbotenen Stadt [Dances from the Forbidden City], (in co-operation with Christof Debler)

2003: Heinrich der König [King Heinrich]

2004: Wohin gehen wir, wenn wir sterben? [Where do we go when we die?]

2005: Salsa!

2005 and 2009: Meisterwerke der Menschheit[Mankind's Masterpieces], 12 episodes (producer)

2005: Waisenkinder – Wenn Eltern zu früh sterben [Orphans: when parents die too soon]

2005: Diabetes – Die Wohlstandsepidemie [Diabetes: The Epidemic of Prosperity]

2006: AVA - Die Stimme meiner Mutter [AVA - The Voice of my Mother]

2008: Mary Wigman – Die Seele des Tanzes [Mary Wigman: The Soul of Dance] (in co-operation with Christof Debler)

2008: Ich kann Dich nicht riechen [I Can't Smell You] (in co-operation with Kathrin Sonderegger)

2009: Karlheinz Stockhausen - Musik für eine bessere Welt [Karlheinz Stockhausen - Music for a Better World] (in co-operation with Thomas von Steinaecker)

2009: I am not alone (producer)

2009: Die ideale Schule, wie Migration gelingt [The Ideal School, or, How Migration Succeeds] (in co-operation with Kathrin Sonderegger)

2009: Ingo Metzmacher – Ein deutscher Dirigent [Ingo Metzmacher: a German conductor] (producer)

2010: Elvis in Las Vegas, (producer)

2010: Südafrika singt – Cape Festival der Stimmen [South Africa Sings: the Cape Festival of Voices

2010: Reise zu Tolstoi [Journey to Tolstoy] (producer)

2011: Auf den Spuren von Easy Rider [Tracking Down Easy Rider], 4 episodes, (producer)

2011: Comedy Mission, 4 episodes (producer)

2012: Sergiu Celibidache – Feuerkopf und Philosoph [Sergiu Celibidache: firebrand and philosopher]

2012: Im Bett mit Paula [In Bed with Paula], (6 episodes), (producer)

2012: John Cage – Alles ist möglich [John Cage: anything is possible], (producer)

2013: Der Chinesische Staatszirkus: Mei Li, Dokumentation [The Chinese State Circus: Mei Li, a documentary]

2014: Richard Strauss und seine Heldinnen [Richard Strauss and his Heroines], Produzent

2014: Der Spielmacher – George Tabori [The Playmaker: George Tabori]

2014: Bewegte Republik Deutschland Siebzig Jahre Kulturgeschichte [The Festive Republic of Germany: 70 years of cultural history], (4 episodes), producer

2015: Von Dada bis Gaga, 100 Jahre Performance Kunst [From Dada to Gaga: 100 years of performance art], (3 episodes)

2017: Heinrich Böll, Ansichten eines Anarchisten, Dokumentation

2018: Kubas langer Schatten der Erinnerung, Dokumentation

2019: upcoming places, Dokumentation, Israel

2019: Effi Briest oder die Elastizität des Herzens, Deutschland, Dokumentation

2020: Berlin baut ein Schloss, Deutschland, Dokumentation

2021: Heinrich Mann der unbekannte Rebell, Dokumentation

Short films 
1998: Incubus

2003: Sibirien [Siberia], freely adapted from the theatre piece Sibirien by Felix Mitterer

2004: Das ist die Sehnsucht [This is Yearning], based on the poem of the same name by Rainer Maria Rilke

2006: Dichter unbekannt – Heinrich Heine [Poet Unknown: Heinrich Heine]

2007: Welcome home

Television programs 
2010: NeoMusic by night, film series, (director, producer)

2010-2013: On Tape', (27 episodes), (producer)

2011: Die Show des Scheiterns [The Failure Files], (8 episodes), (Produzent)

2011–2013: ZDF Kultur Poetry Slam [ZDF Culture: Poetry Slam] (producer)

2009–2015: Arte Lounge, classical music, 30 episodes (producer)

2012–2018: Pufpaffs Happy Hour (50 episodes), (producer)

 Publications 
2008 Matthias Film DVD Wohin gehen wir, wenn wir sterben? [Where Do We Go When We Die?]

2010 naxos video library Great voices of South Africa2012 Arthaus DVD Sergiu Celibidache Firebrand and Philosopher2014 Arthaus DVD Richard Strauss and his Heroines2014 Arthaus DVD Mary Wigman: The soul of dance2015 Filmsortiement Die ideale Schule - Wie Integration gelingt''[The Ideal School: How Integration Succeeds]

References

1963 births
Living people
People from Erbach im Odenwald
German documentary film directors
Mass media people from Hesse
German artists